Geykido Comet Records benefit CD for Afghan Women released in 2002 was in response to the atrocities done to Afghan women by the Taliban. Featuring local unknowns as well as groups like Anti-Flag, Youth Brigade, Chumbawamba, Fleshies, The Frisk and Jello Biafra as well as setting aside 100% of all proceeds to be given to the Revolutionary Association for the Women of Afghanistan (RAWA) this CD was well received by the media as well as the punk scene in general.

Information
 mastered by Shahab Zargari and Dave Small
 aside from generously donated tracks from group albums, many tracks are exclusive to this release alone
 insert features artwork by Shepard Fairey of Obey Giant fame.
The CD features pop, punk, experimental, rock and hip hop acts unifying for one cause.
 released by Geykido Comet Records in 2002

Track listing
 Intro -"In A Land Devoid Of Freedom..."
 ESL?! -"Kabul Waltz"
 Pistol Grip -"Crucifixion Politix"
 Bouncing Souls -"That Song"
 Intro5pect -"Conditioned Reaction"
 Anti-Flag -"911 For Peace "
 Youth Brigade -"It's Not Enough"
 The Devil is Electric -"Relax, It Will Be Over Soon"
 East Arcadia -"Flat World"
 Pinhead Circus -"Bomb The Strip Malls"
 Co-Ed -"Progress"
 Link 80 -"Time For Change"
 Interlude
 Resist and Exist -"Liberation Poem/ Needs"
 FOBIA -"Its Captured"
 Chumbawamba -"Smart Bomb"
 Jack Killed Jill -"You Don't Own Me"
 Fleshies -"Dickholyhalo"
 the Thumbs -"They Improve Ideas"
 The Frisk -"In My Nightmare"
 Iowaska -"Big Deal Get Real"
 Modern Day 84 -"In Pursuit Of Salvation"
 the Voids -"Kill a Generation"
 Litmus Green -"... And Your Buddha Too"
 Armistice -"The Myth"
 the Kill -"If You Think the Scars On My Wrists Are Bad, You Should See My Heart"
 Bikini Bumps -"Loud Enough To Make Your Ears Bleed"
 Ciril -"Strong Woman"
 Jilting -"Saw It Go"
 Kill the Scientist -"Ghasam (Pledge)" (Freedom Remix)
 Randy -"Karl Marx and History"
 Jello Biafra -"Spoken Word"

External links
 Interview in Local Paper about Afghan Benefit
 Geykido Comet Records website

Geykido Comet Records
2002 compilation albums
Punk rock compilation albums
Record label compilation albums
Charity albums